John Bomel (fl. 1402), of Dorchester, Dorset, was an English politician.

Nothing is recorded of Bomel's family or early life.

He was a Member (MP) of the Parliament of England for Dorchester in 1402.

References

14th-century births
15th-century deaths
Members of the Parliament of England for Dorchester
English MPs 1402